The anarchist insurrection of January 1933, also known as the January 1933 revolution, was the second (after the insurrection at Alt Llobregat) of the insurrections carried out by the National Confederation of Labor (CNT) in the Second Spanish Republic, during the First Biennium.

Beginnings 
The insurrection corresponded to the anarchist tactics of the CNT and the FAI, carrying out social agitations that denounced the very poor living conditions of the Spanish working class, situations that would produce the so-called "revolutionary contagion" in which the libertarian revolution would begin in Spain.

In a regional plenary held by the CNT on 1 December 1932 in Madrid, the railway workers' union requested support to declare a general strike in which wage increases would be demanded. In the end, the railway workers backed down because more than half of their union sections thought that the strike would be a failure, but the Catalan Regional Defense Committee took up the idea at the proposal of Juan García Oliver, willing to put into practice "revolutionary gymnastics" which would consist of an "insurrectionary action" that would prevent the consolidation of the "Bourgeois Republic". The chosen date was 8 January 1933.

The insurrection began on 1 January, when from seven in the morning to nine at night, several powerful pumps were blown up in La Felguera, (headquarters of the CNT in Asturias). Simultaneously, in Seville, there were street riots and shops and bars were robbed. In the town of Real de la Jara the agitators set fire to the local church. There was also looting in Lérida, and clashes in Pedro Muñoz, where syndicalists took over the City Hall, proclaiming libertarian communism. On 2 January, the Civil Guard of Barcelona discovered a bomb depot which they attributed to the CNT. On 3 January, another arsenal of explosives was discovered in Barcelona. On 5 January, more artifacts exploded in La Felguera, and in Gijón, and the strikes in Valencia by typographers, metallurgists and employees of the Electra company got more intense.

Propagation 
On 8 January, members of the anarcho-syndicalist movement in Madrid tried to take over the barracks of Carabanchel, causing an exchange of fire with the civil guard. Acts of violence took place in Barcelona around the Arco del Teatro, where the union's headquarters were located. There were also shootings outside the Atarazanas barracks, where an assault guard fell dead, and a corporal was wounded. Three bombs exploded at the Madrid police headquarters.

In Valencia, anarcho-syndicalist organizations added to the turmoil in much of the region. There was disorder throughout Valencia and in numerous towns in the province, such as Riba-roja d'Ebre, Bétera, Benaguasil and Utiel. In Gestalgar several bombs explode. Anarchists took the town of Bugarra, after intense combat with law enforcement, with a balance of more than five dead and several wounded, and proclaimed libertarian communism. In Castellón de la Plana the agitation began on the 10th. In Bugarra a civil guard and an assault guard died during the insurrection. When the Civil Guard retook the town, they killed 10 peasants and detained 250 more.

The agitation spread to Zaragoza, Murcia, Oviedo and other provinces, reaching its greatest resonance in Andalusia, where numerous strikes started. In Seville, cars and trams are set on fire, where the public force faced several shootings. In La Rinconada, libertarian communism was proclaimed. In Casas Viejas, anarcho-syndicalist peasants rose up proclaiming libertarian communism. In response, local law enforcement provoked a massacre of the town's residents, which became a great political scandal.

The National Committee of the CNT, which had not called the strike, declared on 10 January that the insurrection had been "of pure anarchist significance without the federal body having intervened in them", although they did not condemn it, to fulfill "a duty of solidarity and conscience". But it was not the CNT's revolution that would be carried out "with guarantees", "in the light of day."  Solidaridad Obrera, the official newspaper of the CNT, stated that the revolt was "neither defeated nor humiliated" and blamed "the repressive... sectarian policy of the socialists who hold power and use it against the interests of the workers". The revolution "exists and will intensify for reasons of obvious injustice". For this reason, they stated "once one insurrection has been defeated, another arises, a strike is resolved, another occurs; a riot calmed down, a greater one breaks out."

Completion 
In December 1933 the insurrectionary cycle ended with the insurrection in the small town of Bujalance, at the time one of the largest towns in the Province of Córdoba, with an extraordinarily powerful CNT union, The "Harmony" Syndicate of Various Trades, which had more than 3,500 contributors in a city of 13,000 inhabitants. The armed insurrection of the militants of the Bujalance CNT acquired such a revolutionary depth that the republican government needed to move a section of the army to Bujalance from Córdoba, to put an end to the revolutionary uprising and with it the insurrectionary period. Many workers died in the ensuing defense of the town. The subsequent repression was brutal; the Secretary General of the CNT of Bujalance, Milla and the Treasurer, Porcel, were both murdered in the so-called "Puentes de Cañete" when the so-called Ley de Fugas ("Law for the fugitives") was applied to them. Other CNT and FAI militants were given long sentences and were caught in prison by the Nationalists in the military uprising at the start of the civil war.

Much later in "El eco de los pasos" (1978) Juan García Oliver wrote of the scope of the January 1933 revolution, of which he considered himself the principle instigator, by qualifying it as "one of the most serious battles between libertarians and the Spanish State... which determined that the Republican parties and the Socialist Party lost their influence over the majority of Spaniards"

See also 
 Anarchist insurrection of Alt Llobregat
 Anarchist insurrection of December 1933
 Spanish Revolution of 1936

References 

Revolutions in Spain
History of Asturias
1933 in Spain
20th-century revolutions
Conflicts in 1933
Anarchism in Spain